The Lortkipanidze (also transliterated as Lordkipanidze) is a Georgian noble family from the province of Imereti known from 1412/1442.

The head of the House of Lortkipanidze held a hereditary office of Commander of the Men of the Oath (ფიცისკაცები, p’its’iskats’ebi), formed by the members of military aristocracy owing their allegiance directly to the King of Imereti. Under the Russian rule, the Lortkipanidze were recognized as princes of the Russian Empire according to the decree of 1850.

References 

Noble families of Georgia (country)
Russian noble families
Georgian-language surnames
Surnames of Georgian origin